Woden Valley Rams Rugby League Club is an Australian rugby league football club based in Woden, Australian Capital Territory formed in 1967. In 2018, the Rams won their first premiership since 1996 beating the Tuggeranong Bushrangers 31–30.

Notable juniors
Nigel Gaffey (1989–2000 Canberra Raiders, Sydney Roosters & Penrith Panthers)
David Cox (1995–99 Canberra Raiders & Illawarra Steelers)
Luke Priddis (1997–2010 Canberra Raiders, Brisbane Broncos, Penrith Panthers & St George Illawarra Dragons)
Lincoln Withers (2000–13 Canberra Raiders, Wests Tigers, St George Illawarra Dragons & Hull F.C.)
Brenton Lawrence (2011–present Gold Coast Titans & Manly Sea Eagles)
Sami Sauiluma (2013–present Canberra Raiders, Cronulla Sharks & Gold Coast Titans)
Bailey Simonsson (2018–present Canberra Raiders)
Junior Tupou (2022- Wests Tigers)
John Jarvie. (1980-1984 [[Cronulla Sharks and South Sydney Rabbits]

References

John Jarvie ( 1981-1984 Cronulla Sharks South Sydney Rabbits )

External links
 
 

Sporting clubs in Canberra
Rugby league teams in the Australian Capital Territory
Rugby clubs established in 1967
1967 establishments in Australia